Andrew Claude Ridley (born 2 August 1968) is an Australian former cricketer.

Ridley was born at Sydney in August 1968. He studied at the University of Sydney, before undertaking his post-graduate studies in England at Exeter College, Oxford. While studying at Oxford, he made his debut in first-class cricket for Oxford University against Durham at Oxford in 1994. He played first-class cricket for Oxford until 1996, making twenty appearances. Playing as a batsman, he scored 857 runs at an average of 31.74. He made two centuries, with a high score of 155 against Cambridge University in The University Match of 1996. In addition to playing first-class cricket while at Oxford, he also made four List A one-day appearances for the British Universities cricket team in the 1996 Benson & Hedges Cup, scoring 152 runs at an average of 38.00, with a high score of 58.

References

External links

1968 births
Living people
Cricketers from Sydney
University of Sydney alumni
Alumni of Exeter College, Oxford
Australian cricketers
Oxford University cricketers
British Universities cricketers